Preslav Borissov (born 7 March 1977 in Sofia) is a Bulgarian politician who served as a Member of the European Parliament (MEP) for the GERB between 2013 and 2014. He took the seat of Iliana Ivanova on 1 January 2013 after she resigned to join the European Court of Auditors.

References

1977 births
Living people
Politicians from Sofia
GERB MEPs
MEPs for Bulgaria 2009–2014